Juki, also rendered as Chugi and Jugi, may refer to:
 Juki-ye Bizhan
 Juki-ye Vosta